Greater Manchester is a metropolitan and ceremonial county in North West England, with a population of 2.8 million; comprising ten metropolitan boroughs: Manchester, Salford, Bolton, Bury, Oldham, Rochdale, Stockport, Tameside, Trafford and Wigan. The county was created on 1 April 1974, as a result of the Local Government Act 1972, and has been covered by a combined authority on 1 April 2011. Greater Manchester is formed from parts of the historic counties of Cheshire, Lancashire and the West Riding of Yorkshire.

Greater Manchester spans , which roughly covers the territory of the Greater Manchester Built-up Area, the second most populous urban area in the UK. Though geographically landlocked, it is connected to the sea by the Manchester Ship Canal which is still open to shipping in Salford and Trafford. Greater Manchester borders the ceremonial counties of Cheshire (to the south-west and south), Derbyshire (to the south-east), West Yorkshire (to the north-east), Lancashire (to the north) and Merseyside (to the west). There is a mix of high-density urban areas, suburbs, semi-rural and rural locations in Greater Manchester, but land use is mostly urban—the product of concentric urbanisation and industrialisation which occurred mostly during the 19th century when the region flourished as the global centre of the cotton industry. It has a focused central business district, formed by Manchester city centre and the adjoining city of Salford and Borough of Trafford, but Greater Manchester is also a polycentric county with ten metropolitan districts, each district is concentrated around a large town or a city (Manchester and Salford being the only cities). These districts contain suburbs, towns and villages for each city and town.

Greater Manchester is governed by the Greater Manchester Combined Authority (GMCA), which consists of political leaders from each of the ten metropolitan borough councils, plus a directly elected mayor, with responsibility for economic development, regeneration and transport. Andy Burnham is the inaugural Mayor of Greater Manchester, elected in 2017. For the 12 years following 1974, the county had a two-tier system of local government; district councils shared power with the Greater Manchester County Council. The county council was abolished in 1986 and so its districts (the metropolitan boroughs) effectively became unitary authority areas. However, the metropolitan county continued to exist in law and as a geographic frame of reference, and as a ceremonial county, with a Lord Lieutenant and a High Sheriff. Several county-wide services were coordinated through the Association of Greater Manchester Authorities between 1985 and 2011.

Before the creation of the metropolitan county, the name for the area was "South East Lancashire North East Cheshire" (SELNEC). Greater Manchester is an amalgamation of 70 former local government districts from the former administrative counties of Lancashire, Cheshire, the West Riding of Yorkshire and eight independent county boroughs. Since deindustrialisation in the mid-20th century, Greater Manchester has emerged as a major centre for services, media and digital industries, and is renowned for guitar and dance music and its association football teams.

History

Origins
Although Greater Manchester was not created until 1974, the history of its constituent settlements goes back centuries. There is evidence of Iron Age habitation, particularly at Mellor, and Celtic activity in a settlement named Chochion, believed to have been an area of Wigan settled by the Brigantes. Stretford was also part of the land believed to have been occupied by the Celtic Brigantes tribe, and lay on their border with the Cornovii on the southern side of the River Mersey. The remains of 1st-century forts at Castlefield in Manchester, and Castleshaw Roman fort in Saddleworth, are evidence of Roman occupation. Much of the region was omitted from the Domesday Book of 1086; Redhead states that this was because only a partial survey was taken, rather than sparsity of population.

During the Middle Ages, much of what became Greater Manchester lay within the hundred of Salfordshire – an ancient division of the county of Lancashire. Salfordshire encompassed several parishes and townships, some of which, like Rochdale, were important market towns and centres of England's woollen trade. The development of what became Greater Manchester is attributed to a shared tradition of domestic flannel and fustian cloth production, which encouraged a system of cross-regional trade. In the late 18th century, the Industrial Revolution transformed the local domestic system; mechanisation enabled the industrialisation of the region's textile trade, triggering rapid growth in the cotton industry and expansion in ancillary trades. Infrastructure such as rows of terraced housing, factories and roads were constructed to house labour, transport goods, and produce cotton goods on an industrial scale for a global market.

The townships in and around Manchester began expanding "at an astonishing rate" around the turn of the 19th century as part of a process of unplanned urbanisation brought on by a boom in industrial textile production and processing. This population increase resulted in the "vigorous concentric growth" of a conurbation between Manchester and an arc of surrounding mill towns, formed from a steady accretion of houses, factories and transport infrastructure. Places such as Bury, Oldham and Bolton played a central economic role nationally, and by the end of the 19th century had become some of the most important and productive cotton-producing towns in the world. However, it was Manchester that was the most populous settlement, a major city, the world's largest marketplace for cotton goods, and the natural centre of its region. By 1835 "Manchester was without challenge the first and greatest industrial city in the world"; and by 1848 urban sprawl had fused the city to its surrounding towns and hinterland to form a single continuous conurbation. The conurbation was "a Victorian metropolis, achieving its commercial peak during 1890–1915". In the 1910s, local government reforms to administer this conurbation as a single entity were proposed.

In the 18th century, German traders had coined the name Manchesterthum to cover the region in and around Manchester. However, the English term "Greater Manchester" did not appear until the 19th century. One of its first known recorded uses was in planning documents for the Manchester Ship Canal dated 1883, referring to "Manchester, Salford and the Out-Townships". Use in a municipal context appeared in a 1914 report submitted in response to what was considered to have been the successful creation of the County of London in 1889. The report suggested that a county should be set up to recognise the "Manchester known in commerce", and referred to the areas that formed "a substantial part of South Lancashire and part of Cheshire, comprising all municipal boroughs and minor authorities within a radius of eight or nine miles of Manchester". In his 1915 book Cities in Evolution, urban planner Sir Patrick Geddes wrote "far more than Lancashire realises, is growing up another Greater London".

Most of Greater Manchester lies within the ancient county boundaries of Lancashire; those areas south of the Mersey and Tame are historically in Cheshire. The Saddleworth area and a small part of Mossley are historically part of Yorkshire. The areas that were incorporated into Greater Manchester in 1974 previously formed parts of the administrative counties of Cheshire, Lancashire, the West Riding of Yorkshire and of eight independent county boroughs. By the early 1970s, this system of demarcation was described as "archaic" and "grossly inadequate to keep pace both with the impact of motor travel, and with the huge increases in local government responsibilities".

The Manchester Evening Chronicle brought to the fore the issue of "regional unity" for the area in April 1935 under the headline "Greater Manchester – The Ratepayers' Salvation". It reported on the "increasing demands for the exploration of the possibilities of a greater merger of public services throughout Manchester and the surrounding municipalities". The issue was frequently discussed by civic leaders in the area at that time, particularly those from Manchester and Salford. The Mayor of Salford pledged his support to the idea, stating that he looked forward to the day when "there would be a merging of the essential services of Manchester, Salford, and the surrounding districts constituting Greater Manchester." Proposals were halted by the Second World War, though in the decade after it, the pace of proposals for local government reform for the area quickened. In 1947, Lancashire County Council proposed a three "ridings" system to meet the changing needs of the county of Lancashire, including those for Manchester and surrounding districts. Other proposals included the creation of a Manchester County Council, a directly elected regional body. In 1951, the census in the UK began reporting on South East Lancashire as a homogeneous conurbation.

Redcliffe-Maud Report

The Local Government Act 1958 designated the south east Lancashire area (which, despite its name, included part of north east Cheshire), a Special Review Area. The Local Government Commission for England presented draft recommendations, in December 1965, proposing a new county based on the conurbation surrounding and including Manchester, with nine most-purpose boroughs corresponding to the modern Greater Manchester boroughs (excluding Wigan). The review was abolished in favour of the Royal Commission on Local Government before issuing a final report.

The Royal Commission's 1969 report, known as the Redcliffe-Maud Report, proposed the removal of much of the then existing system of local government. The commission described the system of administering urban and rural districts separately as outdated, noting that urban areas provided employment and services for rural dwellers, and open countryside was used by town dwellers for recreation. The commission considered interdependence of areas at many levels, including travel-to-work, provision of services, and which local newspapers were read, before proposing a new administrative metropolitan area. The area had roughly the same northern boundary as today's Greater Manchester (though included Rossendale), but covered much more territory from Cheshire (including Macclesfield, Warrington, Alderley Edge, Northwich, Middlewich, Wilmslow and Lymm), and Derbyshire (the towns of New Mills, Whaley Bridge, Glossop and Chapel-en-le-Frith – a minority report suggested that Buxton be included). The metropolitan area was to be divided into nine metropolitan districts, based on Wigan, Bolton, Bury/Rochdale, Warrington, Manchester (including Salford and Old Trafford), Oldham, Altrincham, Stockport and Tameside. The report noted "The choice even of a label of convenience for this metropolitan area is difficult". Seven years earlier, a survey prepared for the British Association intended to define the "South-East Lancashire conurbation" noted that "Greater Manchester it is not ... One of its main characteristics is the marked individuality of its towns, ... all of which have an industrial and commercial history of more than local significance". The term Selnec (or SELNEC) was already in use as an abbreviation for south east Lancashire and north east Cheshire; Redcliffe-Maud took this as "the most convenient term available", having modified it to south east Lancashire, north east and central Cheshire.

Following the Transport Act 1968, in 1969 the SELNEC Passenger Transport Executive (an authority to co-ordinate and operate public transport in the region) was set up, covering an area smaller than the proposed Selnec, and different again to the eventual Greater Manchester. Compared with the Redcliffe-Maud area, it excluded Macclesfield, Warrington, and Knutsford but included Glossop and Saddleworth in the West Riding of Yorkshire. It excluded Wigan, which was both in the Redcliffe-Maud area and in the eventual Greater Manchester (but had not been part of the 1958 act's review area).

Redcliffe-Maud's recommendations were accepted by the Labour-controlled government in February 1970. Although the Redcliffe-Maud Report was rejected by the Conservative government after the 1970 general election, there was a commitment to local government reform, and the need for a metropolitan county centred on the conurbation surrounding Manchester was accepted. The new government's original proposal was much smaller than the Redcliffe-Maud Report's Selnec, with areas such as Winsford, Northwich, Knutsford, Macclesfield and Glossop retained by their original counties to ensure their county councils had enough revenue to remain competitive (Cheshire County Council would have ceased to exist). Other late changes included the separation of the proposed Bury/Rochdale authority (retained from the Redcliffe-Maud report) into the Metropolitan Borough of Bury and the Metropolitan Borough of Rochdale. Bury and Rochdale were originally planned to form a single district (dubbed "Botchdale" by local MP Michael Fidler) but were divided into separate boroughs. To re-balance the districts, the borough of Rochdale took Middleton from Oldham. During the passage of the bill, the towns of Whitworth, Wilmslow and Poynton successfully objected to their incorporation in the new county.

1974–1997

The Local Government Act 1972 reformed local government in England by creating a system of two-tier metropolitan and non-metropolitan counties and districts throughout the country. The act formally established Greater Manchester on 1 April 1974, although Greater Manchester County Council (GMCC) had been running since elections in 1973. The leading article in The Times on the day the Local Government Act came into effect noted that the "new arrangement is a compromise which seeks to reconcile familiar geography which commands a certain amount of affection and loyalty, with the scale of operations on which modern planning methods can work effectively". Frangopulo noted that the creation of Greater Manchester "was the official unifying of a region which, through history and tradition, had forged for itself over many centuries bonds ... between the communities of town and village, each of which was the embodiment of the character of this region". The name Greater Manchester was adopted, having been favoured over Selnec following public consultation, despite opposition claiming that "Greater Manchester [...] is a myth. An abomination. A travesty.".

By January 1974, a joint working party representing Greater Manchester had drawn up its county Structure Plan, ready for implementation by the Greater Manchester County Council. The plan set out objectives for the forthcoming metropolitan county. The highest priority was to increase the quality of life for its inhabitants by improving the county's physical environment and cultural facilities which had suffered following deindustrialisation—much of Greater Manchester's basic infrastructure dated from its 19th-century growth, and was unsuited to modern lifestyles. Other objectives were to reverse the trend of depopulation in central-Greater Manchester, to invest in country parks to improve the region's poor reputation on leisure facilities, and to improve the county's transport infrastructure and patterns.

Because of political objection, particularly from Cheshire, Greater Manchester covered only the inner, urban 62 of the 90 former districts that the Royal Commission had outlined as an effective administrative metropolitan area. In this capacity, GMCC found itself "planning for an arbitrary metropolitan area ... abruptly truncated to the south", and so had to negotiate several land-use, transport and housing projects with its neighbouring county councils. However a "major programme of environmental action" by GMCC broadly succeeded in reversing social deprevation in its inner city slums. Leisure and recreational successes included the Greater Manchester Exhibition Centre (better known as the G-Mex centre and now branded Manchester Central), a converted former railway station in Manchester city centre used for cultural events, and GMCC's creation of five new country parks within its boundaries. GMCC was, however, criticised for being too Manchester-centric by representatives from the outer suburbs.

A decade after they were established, the mostly Labour-controlled metropolitan county councils and the Greater London Council (GLC) had several high-profile clashes with the Conservative government of Margaret Thatcher, with regards overspending and high rates charging. Government policy on the issue was considered throughout 1982, and the Conservative Party put a "promise to scrap the metropolitan county councils" and the GLC, in their manifesto for the 1983 general election. Greater Manchester County Council was abolished on 31 March 1986 under the Local Government Act 1985. That the metropolitan county councils were controlled by the Labour Party led to accusations that their abolition was motivated by party politics: the general secretary of the National Association of Local Government Officers described it as a "completely cynical manoeuvre". Most of the functions of GMCC were devolved to the ten Greater Manchester metropolitan district councils, though functions such as emergency services and public transport were taken over by joint boards and continued to be run on a county-wide basis. The Association of Greater Manchester Authorities (AGMA) was established to continue much of the county-wide services of the county council. The metropolitan county continues to exist in law, and as a geographic frame of reference, for example as a NUTS 2 administrative division for statistical purposes within the European Union. Although having been a Lieutenancy area since 1974, Greater Manchester was included as a ceremonial county by the Lieutenancies Act 1997 on 1 July 1997.

Combined Authority

In 1998, the people of Greater London voted in a referendum in favour of establishing a new Greater London Authority, with mayor and an elected chamber for the county. The New Local Government Network proposed the creation of a new Manchester City Region based on Greater Manchester and other metropolitan counties as part of on-going reform efforts, while a report released by the Institute for Public Policy Research's Centre for Cities proposed the creation of two administrative city regions based on Manchester and Birmingham. 

The Manchester City Region initially appeared in government documents as one of eight city regions defined in the 2004 strategic document Moving Forward: The Northern Way. In July 2007, The Treasury published its Review of sub-national economic development and regeneration, which stated that the government would allow those city regions that wished to work together to form a statutory framework for city regional activity, including powers over transport, skills, planning and economic development.  The Manchester City Region encompassed fifteen local government districts: the cities of Manchester and Salford plus the metropolitan boroughs of Stockport, Tameside, Trafford, Bolton, Bury, Oldham, Rochdale and Wigan , together with the boroughs of High Peak, Warrington and the former boroughs of Congleton, Macclesfield and Vale Royal.

In January 2008, AGMA suggested that a formal government structure be created to cover Greater Manchester. The issue resurfaced in June 2008 with regards to proposed congestion charging in Greater Manchester; Sir Richard Leese (leader of Manchester City Council) said "I've come to the conclusion that [a referendum on congestion charging should be held] because we don't have an indirectly or directly elected body for Greater Manchester that has the power to make this decision". On 14 July 2008 the ten local authorities in Greater Manchester agreed to a strategic and integrated cross-county Multi-Area Agreement; a voluntary initiative aimed at making district councils "work together to challenge the artificial limits of boundaries" in return for greater autonomy from the central government of the UK. A referendum on the Greater Manchester Transport Innovation Fund was held in December 2008, in which voters "overwhelmingly rejected" plans for public transport improvements linked to a peak-time weekday-only congestion charge.

Following a bid from AGMA highlighting the potential benefits in combatting the financial crisis of 2007–2008, it was announced in the 2009 United Kingdom Budget that Greater Manchester and the Leeds City Region would be awarded Statutory City Region Pilot status, allowing (if they desired) for their constituent district councils to pool resources and become statutory Combined Authorities with powers comparable to the Greater London Authority. The stated aim of the pilot was to evaluate the contributions to economic growth and sustainable development by Combined Authorities. The Local Democracy, Economic Development and Construction Act 2009 enabled the creation of a Combined Authority for Greater Manchester with devolved powers on public transport, skills, housing, regeneration, waste management, carbon neutrality and planning permission, pending approval from the ten councils. Such strategic matters would be decided on via an enhanced majority rule voting system involving ten members appointed from among the councillors of the metropolitan boroughs (one representing each borough with each council nominating one substitute) without the input of central government. The ten district councils of Greater Manchester approved the creation of the Greater Manchester Combined Authority (GMCA) on 29 March 2010, and submitted final recommendations for a constitution to the Department for Communities and Local Government and the Department for Transport and two days later the Communities Secretary John Denham approved the constitution and launched a 15-week public consultation on the draft bill together with the approved constitution. 

Following requests by the Association of Greater Manchester Authorities, which was superseded by the GMCA, the new authority was created on 1 April 2011. On the same day, the Transport for Greater Manchester Committee was also formed from a pool of 33 councillors allocated by council population (roughly one councillor per 75,000 residents) to scrutinise the running of Greater Manchester's transport bodies and their finances, approve the decisions and policies of said bodies and form

strategic policy recommendations or projects for the approval of the Combined Authority. On 3 November 2014, George Osborne, the Chancellor of the Exchequer, announced that there would be an eleventh member of the GMCA – a directly elected Mayor of Greater Manchester, with "powers over transport, housing, planning and policing" from 2017.

City status bids
Bolton and Stockport have made bids for city status but were unsuccessful.

Geography

Greater Manchester is a landlocked county spanning . The Pennines rise to the north and east of the county with the West Pennine Moors in the northwest, the South Pennines in the northeast and the Peak District in the east. Several coalfields (mainly sandstones and shales) lie in the west of the county while the Cheshire Plain fringes the south. The rivers Mersey, Irwell and Tame run through Greater Manchester, all of which rise in the Pennines. Other rivers traverse the region as tributaries to the major rivers, including the Douglas, the Irk, and the Roch.
Greater Manchester is characterised by its dense urban and industrial developments, which include centres of commerce, finance, retail and administration, as well as commuter suburbs and housing, interspersed with transport infrastructure such as light rail, roads and motorway, and canals. There is a mix of high density urban areas, suburbs, semi-rural and rural locations in Greater Manchester, but land use is mostly urban. The built environment of Greater Manchester utilises red brick and sandstone prominently as a building material, alongside structures composed of modern materials, high-rise towers, and landmark 19th, 20th and 21st century buildings in the city and town centres.

Manchester city centre is the commercial and geographic heart of Greater Manchester,  and with the adjoining parts of Salford and Trafford, is defined as Greater Manchester's "Regional Centre" for purposes of urban planning and public transport. Political and economic ties between the city centre and neighbouring Salford and Trafford have strengthened with the shift from town and district centres to metropolitan-level centres in England, and this area's high-rise landmark buildings provide a visual orientation point of reference as a central business district. However, Greater Manchester is also a polycentric county with ten metropolitan districts, each of which has a major town centre – and in some cases more than one – and many smaller settlements. The major towns encircle Manchester city centre, and between them are other outlying towns (such as Denton, Middleton and Failsworth) which are suburban to both the Regional Centre and the major town centres. Combined, these factors make Greater Manchester the most complex "polycentric functional urban region" in the UK outside London.

The Greater Manchester Built-up Area is the conurbation or continuous urban area based around Greater Manchester, as defined by the Office for National Statistics. The European Union designate the conurbation as a single homogonous urban city region. The Built-up Area includes most of Greater Manchester, omitting areas of countryside and small villages, as well as noncontiguous urban towns such as Wigan and Marple. Outside the boundary of Greater Manchester it includes several adjacent areas of settlement and a few outliers connected to the urban sprawl by ribbon development, such as Wilmslow and Alderley Edge in Cheshire, Glossop and Hadfield in Derbyshire, and Whitworth in Lancashire. This conurbation forms part of a megalopolis of 9.4 million across northern England.

Climate
Greater Manchester experiences a temperate maritime climate, like most of the British Isles, with relatively cool summers and mild winters. The mean temperature is slightly above average for the United Kingdom. Greater Manchester has a relatively high humidity level, which lent itself to the optimised and breakage-free textile manufacturing process that took place around the county. Snowfall is not common in the built up areas because of the urban warming effect but the West Pennine Moors in the northwest, South Pennines in the northeast and Peak District in the east receive more snow, and roads leading out of the county can be closed due to heavy snowfall. They include the A62 road via Standedge, the Pennine section of the M62 and the A57, Snake Pass, towards Sheffield.

Flora and fauna

Contrary to its reputation for urban sprawl, Greater Manchester has green belt constraining urban drift, and a "wide and varied range" of wildlife and natural habitats. For instance, the wooded valleys of Bolton, Bury and Stockport, the moorlands north and east of Rochdale, Oldham and Stalybridge, and the reed beds between Wigan and Leigh, harbour flora and fauna of national importance. Mature woodland, scrubland, grassland, high moorland, mossland, agricultural land, lakes, wetlands, river valleys, embankments, urban parks and suburban gardens are habitats found in Greater Manchester which further contribute to biodiversity. The Greater Manchester Ecology Unit classifies Sites of Biological Importance.

Among the SSSIs are Astley and Bedford Mosses which form a network of ancient peat bog on the fringe of Chat Moss, which in turn, at  comprises the largest area of prime farmland in Greater Manchester and contains the largest block of semi-natural woodland in the county. The Wigan Flashes, such as those at Pennington Flash Country Park, are the by-product of coal mining, where subsidence has led to waterbodies collecting in the resulting hollows which form an important reed bed resource in Greater Manchester. Opened in 1979, Sale Water Park is a  area of countryside and parkland in Sale which includes a  artificial lake by the River Mersey.

Clover, sorrel, nettle and thistle are common, and grow wild in Greater Manchester. Common heather (Calluna vulgaris) dominates the uplands, such as Saddleworth Moor, which lies within the South Pennines and Dark Peak area of the Peak District National Park. The Rochdale Canal harbours floating water-plantain (Luronium natams), a nationally endangered aquatic plant. In 2002, Plantlife International launched its County Flowers campaign, asking members of the public to nominate and vote for a wild flower emblem for their county. Common cottongrass (Eriophorum angustifolium), a plant with fluffy white plumes native to wet hollows on high moors, was announced as the county flower of Greater Manchester. The house sparrow, starling, and blackbird are among the most populous bird species in Greater Manchester; magpie and feral pigeon are common and breed in habitats across the county. The South Pennines support internationally important numbers of golden plover, curlew, merlin and twite.

Historic county boundaries

As established above, Greater Manchester is formed of parts of Cheshire, Lancashire and parts of West Riding of Yorkshire. The historic boundary between Cheshire and Lancashire begins from the points of both the River Irwell and Manchester Shipping Canal. The southern parts of the county that form part of Trafford, Stockport and Tameside cover Altrincham, Sale, Stockport, Marple, Cheadle Hulme, Hyde, Denton, Audenshaw, Stalybridge and Wythenshawe (Which became part of Manchester in the 1920s) are all historically part of Cheshire. While a majority of the county north of the River Irwell to as far as Chorley, Darwen, St Helens and Rossendale form a large part of the historic county of Lancashire including Manchester, Salford, Eccles, Bolton, Bury, Prestwich, Swinton, Pendlebury, Wigan, Leigh, Rochdale, Oldham, Ashton-under-Lyne, Stretford, Urmston, Old Trafford, Chadderton, Middleton, Heywood, Radcliffe, Milnrow, Horwich, Blackrod, Westhoughton, Littleborough,  Atherton, Ashton-in-Makerfield and Golborne. The eastern and northeastern parts of the county which include Saddleworth and parts of Rochdale form part of the historic county of West Riding of Yorkshire.

Calls to rejoin historic counties 
Since the formation of Greater Manchester, residents have debated their identities in the metropolitan and historic counties through heritage, culture and governance. Residents in Saddleworth in the Borough of Oldham have called for independence from Greater Manchester and Oldham Council and a new authority covering the Pennines around Greater Manchester and West Yorkshire, and the Saddleworth White Rose Society erected signs with the wording "The Historic West Riding of Yorkshire". A 2015 petition called for Wigan to apply for independence from Greater Manchester and rejoin Lancashire because of its heritage and location. There was a proposal for Horwich, Atherton, Blackrod and Westhoughton to form either a new part of Greater Manchester or become a separate area back within Lancashire possibly under the Borough of Chorley although this was not pursued.

Governance

The Greater Manchester Combined Authority (GMCA) is the top-tier administrative body for the local governance of Greater Manchester. It was established on 1 April 2011 as a pilot combined authority, unique to local government in the United Kingdom. Upon formation, it consisted of ten indirectly elected members, each a directly elected councillor from one of the ten metropolitan boroughs that comprise Greater Manchester. The authority derives most of its powers from the Local Government Act 2000 and Local Democracy, Economic Development and Construction Act 2009, and replaced a range of single-purpose joint boards and quangos in 2011, to provide a formal administrative authority for Greater Manchester with powers over public transport, skills, housing, regeneration, waste management, carbon neutrality and planning permission. Functional executive bodies, such as Transport for Greater Manchester, are responsible for delivery of services in these areas. On 3 November 2014, the Devolution to the Greater Manchester Combined Authority agreement was signed to pass further powers and responsibilities, as well as the establishment of an elected Mayor of Greater Manchester. From April 2016, Greater Manchester became the first area of England to "get full control of its health spending" with a devolution deal which unites the region's health and social care systems under one budget under the control of local leaders, including Greater Manchester's new directly elected mayor. On 4 May 2017, Labour politician Andy Burnham was elected as the inaugural mayor, joining the GMCA as its eleventh member and serving as its leader.

Beneath the GMCA are the ten councils of Greater Manchester's ten districts, which are Bolton, Bury, the City of Manchester, Oldham, Rochdale, the City of Salford, Stockport, Tameside, Trafford and Wigan. These district councils have the greatest powers over public services, and control matters such as council tax, education provision, social housing, libraries and healthcare. Eight of the ten metropolitan boroughs were named after the eight former county boroughs that now compose the largest centres of population and greater historical and political prominence. As an example, the Metropolitan Borough of Stockport is centred on the town of Stockport, a former county borough, but includes other smaller settlements, such as Cheadle, Gatley, and Bramhall. The names of two of the metropolitan boroughs were given a neutral name because, at the time they were created, there was no agreement on the town to be put forward as the administrative centre and neither had a county borough. These boroughs are Tameside and Trafford, centred on Ashton-under-Lyne and Stretford, respectively, and are named with reference to geographical and historical origins. The lowest formal tier of local government in Greater Manchester are the parish councils, which cover the various civil parishes in Greater Manchester, and have limited powers over upkeep, maintenance and small grants.

For the first 12 years after the county was created in 1974, Greater Manchester had a two-tier system of local government, and the metropolitan borough councils shared power with the Greater Manchester County Council. The Greater Manchester County Council, a strategic authority based in what is now Westminster House off Piccadilly Gardens, comprised 106 members drawn from the ten metropolitan boroughs of Greater Manchester. It was a sub-regional body running regional services such as transport, strategic planning, emergency services and waste disposal. In 1986, along with the five other metropolitan county councils and the Greater London Council, the Greater Manchester County Council was abolished, and most of its powers were devolved to the boroughs. Between 1986 and 2011, the boroughs were effectively unitary authority areas, but opted to co-operate voluntarily under the Association of Greater Manchester Authorities (AGMA), which served to create a co-ordinated county-wide approach to issues of common interest to Greater Manchester, such as public transport and the shared labour market, as well as making representations to central government and the European Union.

Although used as a "successful brand", Greater Manchester's politics have been characterised by "entrenched localism and related rivalries", historically resistant to regionalism. The major towns in Greater Manchester retain a "fierce independence", meaning Greater Manchester is administered using "inter-municipal coordination" on a broadly voluntary basis. That eight of the ten borough councils have (for the most part) been Labour-controlled since 1986, has helped maintain this informal co-operation between the districts at a county-level. After the abolition of the county council, the ten authorities of Greater Manchester co-operated voluntarily on policy issues like Local Transport Plans as well as funding the Greater Manchester County Record Office, and local services were administered by statutory joint boards. Now under the direction of the Greater Manchester Combined Authority, these joint boards are Transport for Greater Manchester (TfGM) which is responsible for planning and co-ordinating public transport across the county; the Greater Manchester Fire and Rescue Service, who are administered by a joint Fire and Rescue Authority; and the Greater Manchester Waste Disposal Authority. These joint boards are made up of councillors appointed from each of the ten boroughs (except the Waste Disposal Authority, which does not include the Metropolitan Borough of Wigan). Greater Manchester Police was formerly overseen by a joint police authority, but was briefly overseen by the Greater Manchester Police and Crime Commissioner from 2012 until the functions of that office were subsumed into the new regional mayoralty upon its creation in 2017. The ten borough councils are joint-owners of the Manchester Airport Group which controls Manchester Airport and three other UK airports. Other services are directly funded and managed by the local councils.

Greater Manchester is a ceremonial county with its own Lord-Lieutenant who is the personal representative of the monarch. The Local Government Act 1972 provided that the whole of the area to be covered by the new metropolitan county of Greater Manchester would also be included in the Duchy of Lancaster – extending the duchy to include areas which are historically in the counties of Cheshire and the West Riding of Yorkshire. Until 31 March 2005, Greater Manchester's Keeper of the Rolls was appointed by the Chancellor of the Duchy of Lancaster; they are now appointed by the Lord High Chancellor of Great Britain. The first Lord Lieutenant of Greater Manchester was Sir William Downward who held the title from 1974 to 1988. The current Lord Lieutenant is Warren James Smith. As a geographic county, Greater Manchester is used by the government (via the Office for National Statistics) for the gathering of county-wide statistics, and organising and collating general register and census material.

In terms of representation in the Parliament of the United Kingdom, Greater Manchester is divided into 27 parliamentary constituencies. Most of Greater Manchester is represented in Parliament by the Labour Party, and is generally considered a Labour stronghold.

Demography

Greater Manchester has a population of 2,867,800 (2021 Census), making it the third most populous county in England after Greater London and the West Midlands and the highest ever for the county. The demonym of Greater Manchester is "Greater Mancunian". The Manchester accent and dialect, native to Manchester, is common in the city and adjacent areas, but gives way to "slower, deeper accents" towards Greater Manchester's fringes and suburbs.

Greater Manchester is home to a diverse population and is a multicultural agglomeration with an ethnic minority population comprising 8.5% of the total population in 2001. In 2008, there were over 66 refugee nationalities in the county. At the 2001 UK census, 74.2% of Greater Manchester's residents were Christian, 5.0% Muslim, 0.9% Jewish, 0.7% Hindu, 0.2% Buddhist, and 0.1% Sikh. 11.4% had no religion, 0.2% had an alternative religion and 7.4% did not state their religion. This is similar to the rest of the country, although the proportions of Muslims and Jews are nearly twice the national average. It contains the Heaton Park Hebrew Congregation, a large Ashkenazi Orthodox synagogue in North Manchester. Greater Manchester is covered by the Roman Catholic Dioceses of Salford and Shrewsbury, and the Archdiocese of Liverpool. Much of Greater Manchester is part of the Anglican Diocese of Manchester, apart from Wigan which lies within the Diocese of Liverpool and parts of Stockport, Tameside and Trafford, which are in the Diocese of Chester.

Following the deindustrialisation of Greater Manchester in the mid-20th century, there was a significant economic and population decline in the region, particularly in Manchester and Salford. Vast areas of low-quality squalid terraced housing that were built throughout the Victorian era were found to be in a poor state of repair and unsuited to modern needs; many inner-city districts suffered from chronic social deprivation and high levels of unemployment. Slum clearance and the increased building of social housing overspill estates by Salford and Manchester City Councils lead to a decrease in population in central Greater Manchester. During the 1970s, 1980s and 1990s, the population of Greater Manchester declined by over 8,000 inhabitants a year. While Manchester's population shrank by about 40% during this time (from 766,311 in 1931 to 452,000 in 2006), the total population of Greater Manchester decreased by only 8%.

Greater Manchester's housing stock comprises a variety of types. Manchester city centre is noted for its high-rise apartments, while Salford has some of the tallest and most densely populated tower block estates in Europe. Saddleworth has stone-built properties, including farmhouses and converted weavers' cottages. Throughout Greater Manchester, rows of terraced houses are common, most of them built during the Victorian and Edwardian periods. House prices and labour markets differ in Greater Manchester between north and south, such that in the 2000s, the Housing Market Renewal Initiative identified Manchester, Salford, Rochdale and Oldham as areas with terraced housing unsuited to modern needs. In contrast, towns and villages in southern Greater Manchester, from Bramhall through Woodford to Altrincham constitute an arc of wealthy commuter towns. Altrincham in particular, with its neighbours Bowdon and Hale, forms a "stockbroker belt, with well-appointed dwellings in an area of sylvan opulence".

Education

Greater Manchester has five universities: the Manchester Metropolitan University, the University of Bolton, the University of Law, the University of Manchester and the University of Salford. Together with the Royal Northern College of Music they had a combined population of students of 101,165 in 2007 – the third highest number in England behind Greater London (360,890) and the West Midlands (140,980), and the thirteenth highest in England per head of population. The majority of students are concentrated on Oxford Road in Manchester, Europe's largest urban higher education precinct.

As of 2010, further education in Greater Manchester is co-ordinated by the Greater Manchester Colleges Group, a joint venture composed of an association of 24 colleges in the region. Primary and secondary education within Greater Manchester are the responsibility of the constituent boroughs which form local education authorities and administer schools. The county has several independent schools such as Bolton School, Bury Grammar School, Manchester Grammar School, Oldham Hulme Grammar School, St Bede's College, Stockport Grammar School and Chethams School of Music.

Economy

Much of Greater Manchester's wealth was generated during the Industrial Revolution, particularly textile manufacture. The world's first cotton mill was built in the town of Royton, and the county encompasses several former mill towns. An Association for Industrial Archaeology publication describes Greater Manchester as "one of the classic areas of industrial and urban growth in Britain, the result of a combination of forces that came together in the 18th and 19th centuries: a phenomenal rise in population, the appearance of the specialist industrial town, a transport revolution, and weak local lordship". Much of the county was at the forefront of textile manufacture during the Industrial Revolution and into the early-20th century; Peter Smith, Baron Smith of Leigh, chair of the Greater Manchester Combined Authority said "clearly, all of the Greater Manchester area was once at the heart of a very vibrant [textiles] industry", represented by former textile mills found throughout the county. The territory that makes up Greater Manchester experienced a rapid decline of these traditional sectors, partly during the Lancashire Cotton famine brought on by the American Civil War, but mainly as part of the post-war economic depression and deindustrialization of Britain that occurred during the 20th century.

Considerable industrial restructuring has helped the region to recover from deindustrialisation and the demise of the mass production of textiles. Historically, the docks at Salford Quays were an industrial port, though are now (following a period of disuse) a commercial and residential area which includes the Imperial War Museum North and The Lowry theatre and exhibition centre. The BBC is now established in their new home at MediaCityUK, at Salford Quays. This is home to BBC North West, several BBC departments, including BBC Sport, Blue Peter and, since April 2012, BBC Breakfast. Rochdale and Manchester are connected to the history of the cooperative movement; the Rochdale Society of Equitable Pioneers (an early consumer co-operative) was founded in Rochdale in 1844, and The Co-operative Group, the UK's largest mutual business and North West England's biggest company, is headquartered at One Angel Square in central Manchester. Despite this economic diversification, as of November 2012, government plans are under development to revive textile production in Greater Manchester, and restore it as the national home of British textile manufacture.

Today, Greater Manchester is the economic centre of the North West region of England and is the largest sub-regional economy in the UK outside London and South East England. Greater Manchester represents more than £42 billion of the UK regional GVA, more than Wales, Northern Ireland or North East England. Manchester city centre, the central business district of Greater Manchester, is a major centre of trade and commerce and provides Greater Manchester with a global identity, specialist activities and employment opportunities; similarly, the economy of the city centre is dependent upon the rest of the county for its population as an employment pool, skilled workforce and for its collective purchasing power. Manchester today is a centre of the arts, the media, higher education and commerce. In a poll of British business leaders published in 2006, Manchester was regarded as the best place in the UK to locate a business. It is the third most visited city in the United Kingdom by foreign visitors and is now often considered to be the second city of the UK. 

At the 2001 UK census, there were 1,805,315 residents of Greater Manchester aged 16 to 74. The economic activity of these people was 40.3% in full-time employment, 11.3% in part-time employment, 6.7% self-employed, 3.5% unemployed, 5.1% students without jobs, 2.6% students with jobs, 13.0% retired, 6.1% looking after home or family, 7.8% permanently sick or disabled and 3.5% economically inactive for other reasons. The figures follow the national trend, although the percentage of self-employed people is below the national average of 8.3%. The proportion of unemployment in the county varies, with the Metropolitan Borough of Stockport having the lowest at 2.0% and Manchester the highest at 7.9%. In 2001, of the 1,093,385 residents of Greater Manchester in employment, the industry of employment was: 18.4% retail and wholesale; 16.7% manufacturing; 11.8% property and business services; 11.6% health and social work; 8.0% education; 7.3% transport and communications; 6.7% construction; 4.9% public administration and defence; 4.7% hotels and restaurants; 4.1% finance; 0.8% electricity, gas, and water supply; 0.5% agriculture; and 4.5% other. This was roughly in line with national figures, except for the proportion of jobs in agriculture which is only about a third of the national average of 1.5%, due to the overwhelmingly urban, built-up land use of Greater Manchester.

Transport

Public transport services in Greater Manchester are co-ordinated by Transport for Greater Manchester (TfGM), a public body with powers between those of a passenger transport executive and Transport for London, established as SELNEC PTE in 1969 in accordance with the Transport Act 1968. The original SELNEC Passenger Transport Executive was renamed as the Greater Manchester Passenger Transport Executive (GMPTE) when taken over by the Greater Manchester County Council on 1 April 1974 to co-ordinate public transport modes within the new county. The council had overall responsibility for strategic planning and all policy decisions covering public transport (such as bus and rail services) and highways. GMPTE's purpose was to secure the provision of a completely integrated and efficient system of passenger transport for Greater Manchester on behalf of the county council. In 1977, it was noted as the largest authority for public transport in the United Kingdom after London Transport. GMPTE was renamed as Transport for Greater Manchester in April 2011 when it became a functional body of the Greater Manchester Combined Authority and obtained powers additional to those of a regular passenger transport executive from central government.

Greater Manchester lies at the heart of the North West transport network. Much of the infrastructure converges at Manchester city centre with the Manchester Inner Ring Road, an amalgamation of several major roads, circulating the city centre. The county is the only place in the UK to have a fully orbital motorway, the M60, which passes through all of the boroughs except Bolton and Wigan. Greater Manchester has a higher percentage of the motorway network than any other county in the country, and according to the Guinness Book of World Records, it has the most traffic lanes side by side (17), spread across several parallel carriageways (M61 at Linnyshaw in Walkden, close to the M60 interchange). Greater Manchester's  of motorway network saw 5.8 billion vehicle kilometres in 2002 – about 6% of the UK's total, or 89,000 vehicles a day. The A580 "East Lancs" road is a primary A road that connects Manchester and Salford with Liverpool. It was the UK's first purpose-built intercity highway and was officially opened by George V on 18 July 1934. Throughout 2008, there were proposals for congestion charging in Greater Manchester. Unlike the London scheme, two cordons would have been used, one covering the main urban core of the Greater Manchester Urban Area and another covering Manchester city centre.

Metrolink is Greater Manchester's light rail system, which began operating in 1992. The system is owned by TfGM and operated and maintained under contract by a Keolis / Amey consortium. Greater Manchester has a heavy rail network of 142 route miles (229 km) with 98 stations, forming a central hub to the North West rail network. Train services are provided by private operators and run on the national rail network which is owned and managed by Network Rail. There is an extensive bus network which radiates from Manchester city centre. The largest providers are Diamond Bus North West, First Greater Manchester, Go North West and Stagecoach Manchester. An extensive canal network also remains from the Industrial Revolution.

Manchester Airport, which is the third busiest in the United Kingdom, serves the county and wider region with flights to more worldwide destinations than any other airport in the UK. Since June 2007 it has served 225 routes. The airport handled 21.06  million passengers in 2008.

The three modes of public surface transport in the area are heavily used. 19.7 million rail journeys were made in the then GMPTE-supported area in the 2005/2006 financial year – an increase of 9.4% over 2004/2005; there were 19.9 million journeys on Metrolink; and the bus system carried 219.4 million passengers.

Sport

Manchester hosted the 2002 Commonwealth Games which was, at a cost of £200M for the sporting facilities and a further £470M for local infrastructure, by far the biggest and most expensive sporting event held in the UK at the time and the first to be an integral part of urban regeneration. A mix of new and existing facilities were used. New amenities included the Manchester Aquatics Centre, Bolton Arena, the National Squash Centre, and the City of Manchester Stadium. The Manchester Velodrome was built as part of the Manchester bid for the 2000 Summer Olympics. After the Commonwealth Games the City of Manchester Stadium was converted for football use, and the adjacent warm-up track upgraded to become the Manchester Regional Arena. Other facilities continue to be used by elite athletes. Cambridge Policy Consultants estimate 4,500 full-time jobs as a direct consequence, and Grattan points to other long-term benefits accruing from publicity and the improvement of the area's image.

Association football is "woven into the cultural fabric of Greater Manchester", by way of its numerous football clubs – two of which play in the Premier League – which draw support, visitors and economic benefits to Greater Manchester valued at £330 million per year as of 2013. The Manchester Football Association is the sport's governing body in Greater Manchester, and is committed to its promotion and development. Manchester United F.C. are one of the world's best-known football teams, and in 2008 and 2017 Forbes estimated that they were the world's richest club. They have won the League Championship a record twenty times (most recently in 2012–2013), the FA Cup twelve times, the Football League Cup five times and have been European Champions three times. Their Old Trafford ground has hosted the FA Cup Final, England international matches and the 2003 UEFA Champions League Final between Juventus and A.C. Milan. Manchester City F.C. moved from Maine Road to the City of Manchester Stadium after the 2002 Commonwealth Games. They have won the league championship seven times (most recently in 2020–21), the FA Cup six times and the Football League Cup eight times. Wigan Athletic F.C. are one of the county's younger sides and won their first major trophy in 2013, defeating Manchester City F.C. in the FA Cup final. They currently play in the Championship, while Bolton Wanderers F.C. play in League One. Below that are League Two sides Rochdale A.F.C., Salford City F.C., Stockport County F.C. and National League side Oldham Athletic A.F.C.

In rugby league, Wigan Warriors, Leigh Leopards,  and Salford Red Devils compete in the Super League, the top-level professional rugby league football club competition in Europe. Wigan have won the Super League/Rugby Football League Championship twenty–one times, the Challenge Cup nineteen times, and the World Club Challenge three times. Swinton Lions, and Oldham R.L.F.C. play in the second tier Championship, whilst Rochdale Hornets play in the third tier League 1 There is also a large network of junior/community rugby league clubs across the metropolitan area which act as feeder teams to the elite sides, the most notable being Manchester Rangers. In rugby union, Sale Sharks compete in the Guinness Premiership, and won the league in 2006. Whitefield based Sedgley Park RUFC compete in National Division One, Manchester RUFC in National Division Two and Wigan side Orrell R.U.F.C. in National Division Three North.

Lancashire County Cricket Club began as Manchester Cricket Club and represents the (ancient) county of Lancashire. Lancashire contested the original 1890 County Championship. The team has won the County Championship nine times, most recently in 2011. Their Old Trafford ground, near the football stadium of the same name, regularly hosts test matches. Possibly the most famous took place in 1956, when Jim Laker took a record nineteen wickets in the fourth test against Australia. Cheshire County Cricket Club are a minor counties club who sometimes play in the south of the county.

The National Speedway Stadium in Gorton is the home to top-flight speedway team the Belle Vue Aces, and the Manchester Titans American football club. Greater Manchester was previously home to the largest Greyhound racing track in the United Kingdom, the Belle Vue Stadium, which closed in 2020. Professional ice hockey is held at the purpose-designed rink in Altrincham, the Altrincham Ice Dome, which host the Manchester Storm of the Elite Ice Hockey League and the Altrincham Aces of the National Ice Hockey League.

Horse racing has taken place at several sites in the county. The two biggest courses were both known as Manchester Racecourse – though neither was within the boundaries of Manchester – and ran from the 17th century until 1963. Racing was at Kersal Moor until 1847 when the racecourse at Castle Irwell was opened. In 1867 racing was moved to New Barnes, Weaste, until the site was vacated (for a hefty price) in 1901 to allow an expansion to Manchester Docks. The land is now home to Dock 9 of the re-branded Salford Quays. Racing then moved back to Castle Irwell which later staged a Classic – the 1941 St. Leger – and was home to the Lancashire Oaks (nowadays run at Haydock Park) and the November Handicap, which was traditionally the last major race of the flat season. Through the late-1950s and early-1960s the track saw Scobie Breasley and Lester Piggott annually battle out the closing acts of the jockey's title until racing ceased on 7 November 1963.

The Greater Manchester Athletics Association is the governing body of athletics in Greater Manchester, and organises events and competitions within Greater Manchester. The Greater Manchester Marathon is a long-distance running event along a 26-mile and 385-yard course throughout the borough of Trafford. Professional athletics takes place at the Regional Athletics Arena in Sportcity, which has hosted numerous national trials, Robin Park in Wigan, Longford Park in Stretford (home to Trafford Athletic Club), Woodbank Stadium in Stockport (home to Stockport Harriers) and the Cleavleys Track in Winton (home to Salford Harriers). The 12,000seat Leigh Sports Village is a stadium and athletics venue home to the Leigh Harriers, Leigh Leopards Rugby League Club and the Manchester United W.F.C..

The Greater Manchester Community Basketball Club is an association which represents Greater Manchester in basketball. It supports a variety of teams, including Manchester Magic. The Greater Manchester County Crown Green Bowling Association appoints Junior, Senior and Veteran teams to represent Greater Manchester in the sport of bowls. Founded by Greater Manchester's ten district councils in 1996, GreaterSport is the County Sports Partnership for Greater Manchester which works closely with the sports and physical activity sectors and coordinates events such as the Greater Manchester Youth Games. The Greater Manchester Sports Fund aims to ensure that people in Greater Manchester aged 12–21 competing in any kind of sport, irrespective of background, are able to obtain grants of up to £750 so that they can better fulfil their potential.

Culture
Art, tourism, culture and sport provide 16% of employment in Greater Manchester, with the proportion highest in Manchester. In 2014, Will Straw remarked that "Greater Manchester is a creative powerhouse", recognised for its cultural output in areas such as association football, media and digital content, and guitar and dance music. Since the industrial revolution, Greater Manchester has shared a rivalry with the nearby Liverpool, based on economic and industrial competition.

Cuisine

There are several delicacies native to Greater Manchester. Savoury dishes include black pudding, a blood sausage typically associated with Bury and Bury Market; pasty barm, a combined pasty-barm cake created in Bolton; and rag pudding, a suet pastry pudding from Oldham filled with steak and onion and steamed in a cloth or wrapper to cook; the Manchester egg was introduced in 2010. Sweet dishes include Eccles cake — native to Eccles — a small round flaky pastry cake filled with currants, sugar and spice; Manchester tart, a baked tart which consists of a shortcrust pastry shell spread with raspberry jam, covered with a custard filling and topped with flakes of coconut; and Uncle Joe's Mint Balls, traditional sweet mild mints manufactured in Wigan since their inception in 1898. Vimto and Tizer are soft drinks invented in Manchester in 1908 and 1924 respectively. Boddingtons is a bitter developed in Manchester and promoted as the "Cream of Manchester" in a popular 1990s advertising campaign credited with raising the city's profile.

The Greater Manchester Campaign for Real Ale is a branch of the national Campaign for Real Ale, an advocacy group that supports, promotes and preserves the beer and drinks industry, and recognising outstanding venues with awards; The Nursery in Heaton Norris was its National Pub of the Year in 2001, and The Baum in Rochdale was its National Pub of the Year in 2012. The Manchester Food and Drink Festival was launched in 1997 as an urban beverage and gastronomy fair, principally held in Manchester city centre with further events throughout Greater Manchester; smaller separate local events include the Prestwich Food and Drink Festival, the annual World Pie Eating Championship in Wigan, and the annual Ramsbottom Chocolate Festival. As of 2020 Manchester has 1 Michelin Star restaurant: Mana, which is still retained presently. The region also has three eateries in the Bib Gourmand category.

Galleries, museums and exhibitions

The Greater Manchester Museums Group (GMMG) is a partnership of eight of the ten Museum Services in Greater Manchester. Its exhibition centres include: Gallery Oldham, which has in the past featured work by Pablo Picasso; Salford Museum and Art Gallery, a local museum with a recreated Victorian street; and Bolton Museum, which houses material from private collectors, including geological specimens from the estate of Caroline Birley. Separate from the GMMG is The Lowry at Salford Quays, which has a changing display of L. S. Lowry's work alongside travelling exhibitions. Manchester Art Gallery is a major provincial art gallery noted for its collection of Pre-Raphaelite art and housed in a Grade I listed building by Charles Barry.

Greater Manchester's museums showcase the county's industrial and social heritage. The Hat Works in Stockport is the UK's only museum dedicated to the hatting industry; the museum moved in 2000 to a Grade II listed Victorian mill, previously a hat factory. The Museum of Science and Industry in Manchester, amongst other displays, charts the rise of science and industry and especially the part Manchester played in its development; the Museums, Libraries and Archives Council described the displays as "pre-eminent collections of national and international importance". Urbis began its life as a museum of the modern city, which attempted to explain the effects and experiences of life in the city. It was then transformed into an exhibition centre, which had its most successful year in 2006. Urbis entered its third phase since opening in 2012 as the National Football Museum. Stockport Air Raid Shelters uses a mile of tunnels, built to accommodate 6,500 people, to illustrate life in the Second World War's air raid shelters. The Imperial War Museum North in Trafford Park is one of the Imperial War Museum's five branches. Alongside exhibitions of war machinery are displays describing how people's lives are affected by war. The Museum of Transport in Manchester, which opened in 1979, has one of the largest collections of vehicles in the country. The People's History Museum is "the national centre for the collection, conservation, interpretation and study of material relating to the history of working people in Britain". The Pankhurst Museum is based in the early feminist Emmeline Pankhurst's former home and includes a parlour laid out in contemporary style. Manchester United, Manchester City, and Lancashire CCC all have dedicated museums illustrating their histories. Wigan Pier, best known from George Orwell's book The Road to Wigan Pier, was the name of a wharf on the Leeds and Liverpool Canal in Wigan. It will re-open as a visitor attraction in 2023, after years of closure. The town is also home to the Museum of Wigan Life.

Media, film and television
The Greater Manchester Film Festival was launched in 2012. It is an international film festival designed to capitalise on Greater Manchester's "huge strengths in film and television, along with its growing media presence". MediaCityUK, a host venue of the Greater Manchester Film Festival, is a  mixed-use property development site at Salford Quays; its principal tenants are mass media organisations such as ITV Granada and the BBC. One of Greater Manchester's most lucrative and acclaimed television exports is Coronation Street, which is a televised soap opera set in Weatherfield, a fictional borough of Greater Manchester, inspired by life in Salford. Created by Tony Warren, Coronation Street was first broadcast on 9 December 1960, making it the world's longest-running TV soap opera in production. It has been filmed in Manchester at Granada Studios since its inception, but filming is now done at a new set at MediaCityUK.

A local television station for Greater Manchester, Channel M, was launched in February 2000, carrying a wide range of local programming, including news, sport and entertainment programming. Following severe cutbacks to its local production amid heavy losses, the station ceased broadcasting in April 2012. A smaller-scale local TV station, That's Manchester, began broadcasting in May 2015.

The Manchester Evening News is a regional daily newspaper covering Greater Manchester, published every day except Sunday. It is owned by Reach plc and produced by MEN Media. It sells around 81,000 copies a day and gives away nearly 100,000, making it the market leader in Greater Manchester. The paper was first published in 1868 by Mitchell Henry as part of his parliamentary election campaign for the Manchester constituency. MEN Media "dominates Greater Manchester", reaching 7 out of 10 adults each week within the region through its portfolio of products which also includes the Oldham Advertiser, the Rochdale Observer, and the Salford Advertiser.

Music, theatre and performing arts

Greater Manchester has the highest number of theatre seats per head of population outside London. Most, if not all, of the larger theatres are subsidised by local authorities or the North West Regional Arts Board. The Royal Exchange Theatre formed in the 1970s out of a peripatetic group staging plays at venues such as at the University [of Manchester] Theatre and the Apollo Theatre. A season in a temporary stage in the former Royal Exchange, Manchester was followed by funding for a theatre in the round, which opened in 1976. The Lowry — Greater Manchester's most visited tourist attraction — houses two theatres, used by travelling groups in all the performing arts. The Opera House is a 1,900-seat venue hosting travelling productions, often musicals just out of the West End. Its sister venue, The Palace, hosts generally similar shows. The Oldham Playhouse, one of the older theatres in the region, helped launch the careers of Stan Laurel and Charlie Chaplin. Its productions are described by the 2007 CityLife guide as 'staunchly populist' – and popular. There are many other venues scattered throughout the county, of all types and sizes.

Greater Manchester has four professional orchestras, all based in Manchester. The Hallé Orchestra is the UK's oldest symphony orchestra (and the fourth oldest in the world), supports a choir and a youth orchestra, and releases its recordings on its own record label. The Hallé is based at the Bridgewater Hall but often tours, typically giving 70 performances "at home" and 40 on tour. The BBC Philharmonic Orchestra, one of five BBC orchestras is based in MediaCityUK in Salford. It can trace its history back to the early days of radio broadcasting in 1926. The Manchester Camerata and the Northern Chamber Orchestra are smaller, though still professional, organisations. The main classical venue is the 2,341-seat Bridgewater Hall in Manchester, opened in 1996 at a cost of £42m.
Manchester is also a centre for musical education, via the Royal Northern College of Music and Chetham's School of Music.

The Manchester Arena holds over 21,000 people, and is the largest indoor arena in the United Kingdom. It has been voted International Venue of the Year, and for several years was the most popular venue in the world. The 23,500-seat Co-op Live arena is under construction in Greater Manchester, it will open in 2023. Sports grounds in Greater Manchester, such as the City of Manchester Stadium, also host large live-music events. A £200million flexible, large-scale cultural, arts, and exhibition space named The Factory is under construction on the former site of Granada Studios in central Manchester. It is named with reference to Factory Records, a Manchester-based independent record label, founded in 1978 by Tony Wilson and Alan Erasmus. Factory Records – which featured acts such as Joy Division, New Order, and the Happy Mondays — and The Haçienda, served as a catalyst in the late-1980s for a blending of alternative rock, psychedelic rock and electronic dance music known as Madchester. Greater Manchester continues to be associated with guitar and dance music.

See also

Outline of England
Grade I listed buildings in Greater Manchester
Grade II* listed buildings in Greater Manchester
List of people from Greater Manchester
List of public art in Greater Manchester
Parliament of the United Kingdom Relocation
Healthcare in Greater Manchester

Notes

References

Bibliography

External links

www.agma.gov.uk, the Association of Greater Manchester Authorities
www.gmcro.co.uk, the Greater Manchester County Record Office, for historical records relating to Greater Manchester
www.visitmanchester.com, the official tourism website for Greater Manchester

 
Metropolitan counties
NUTS 2 statistical regions of the United Kingdom
Counties of England established in 1974